Lydia Bourouiba is an Esther and Harold E. Edgerton Professor, an Associate Professor in the Civil and Environmental Engineering and Mechanical Engineering departments, and in the Institute for Medical Engineering and Science at the Massachusetts Institute of Technology. She is also a Harvard-MIT Health Sciences and Technology Faculty, and Affiliate Faculty of Harvard Medical School. She directs the Fluid Dynamics of Disease Transmission Laboratory at MIT.

Bourouiba's research considers the fluid dynamics of disease transmission. Her work has overturned previous conventional thinking about sneezes and disease transmission. Bourouiba studies respiratory pathogen emissions, work that has significant implications for the COVID-19 pandemic and for limiting transmission of the coronavirus disease and future pandemics. She was elected a Fellow of the American Physical Society in 2021.

Early life and education 
In 2008, Bourouiba completed her graduate research at McGill University, Canada, where she developed a theoretical description of turbulence fluid flow, after majoring in mathematics and physics in her undergraduate studies. After completing her doctorate, she joined the Department of Mathematics at MIT. There she started to concentrate on coughs and sneezes; "violent expiratory events". She believed that rooting her epidemiological studies in physics and fluid mechanics would allow her to understand the spread of emerging infectious diseases, including SARS and Ebola virus disease. She also worked in Toronto at the Centre for Disease Modelling where she modelled the spread of influenza.

Research and career 
Bourouiba uses mathematical modelling to understand the spread of disease. After her early work in the modelling and theoretical aspects of expiratory events, when she joined Massachusetts Institute of Technology in 2010, she became interested in the size distribution of exhaled droplets. Bourouiba established a new laboratory at Massachusetts Institute of Technology, the Fluid Dynamics of Disease Transmission Laboratory, that combines fluid dynamics with epidemiological modelling. It includes at biosafety level 2 laboratory, which permits the study of the sneezes of healthy patients as well as those with influenza.

In 2016, Bourouiba used two high-speed video cameras to show the movement of fluid droplets that spread from a sneeze. The cameras were set up to collect thousands of frames per second, which facilitated the study of the sneezes in slow motion. High-speed video footage of more than 100 sneezes allowed Bourouiba to analyse the 150 millisecond long moments during which a sneeze is expelled into the air. Her videos showed that sneezes, exhalations, and coughs consist of mucosalivary droplets that are primarily made of a multi-phase gas cloud. This gas cloud grows as it moves away from the mouth, drawing in air from the surrounding environment. She showed that the fluid sheet of droplets balloons then evolves into long filaments and eventually disperses as a spray of smaller droplets. 

This complex fluid cascade was not as simple as models that had previously been used to model coughs and sneezes, and showed that the spread of droplets could be strongly impacted by environmental temperature and humidity. The conditions within the turbulent gas cloud can extend the lifetime of the enclosed droplets. These turbulent gas clouds were shown to protect the droplets as they move through the air, and the internal climate of the cloud was shown to extend the lifetime of the enclosed droplets. Bourouiba demonstrated that exhalation can reach speeds of 10 – 30 ms−1, which means that droplets bearing pathogens can travel up to eight metres. Eventually, the pathogen bearing droplets within these turbulent clouds evaporate, leaving behind a spray of residue and droplet nuclei. The residues can survive in the air for hours, eventually following the air flow that is imposed by climate control systems. Bourouiba believes that this analysis can better inform public health interventions, as well as identify people who may act as super-spreaders. 

During the COVID-19 pandemic, Bourouiba has applied her models of sneezes to SARS-CoV-2, to help to understand and slow the spread of the disease. Early reports from China indicated that particles of the virus were found in the hospital rooms of patients who were infected with the disease. She has argued that the guidance given by the World Health Organization (WHO) and Centers for Disease Control (CDC) may underestimate the distances required for safe social distancing as they do not take into account the dynamics of the turbulent puff cloud. Alongside improving estimations of 'safe' distances, Bourouiba has looked to understand the efficacy of face masks during the COVID-19 pandemic.

Bourouiba founded the first international Fluids and Health Conference in 2019. The conference will become 
a Gordon Research Conference as of 2022. 

Her research on sneezes formed the basis of educational materials produced by Science Friday.

Awards  
In 2021, Bourouiba was elected as a Fellow of the American Physical Society in the Division of Fluid Dynamics for her “fundamental work in quantitatively elucidating the mechanisms of droplet impact and fragmentation and for pioneering a new field at the intersection of fluid dynamics and transmission of respiratory and foodborne pathogens with clear and tangible contributions to public health.”

The Bourouiba Group received the Tse Cheuk Ng Tai Prize for Innovative Research in Health Sciences in 2014. Bourouiba has also received the Smith Family Foundation Odyssey Award for high-risk/high-reward basic science research in 2018, and the Ole Madsen Mentoring Award in 2019.

Selected publications 
 L. Bourouiba. Healthy Teaching Recommendations: In-person teaching in times of COVID-19, Summer 2021, healthy-teaching.org, .

Personal life 
Bourouiba spent part of her childhood in Algeria, during the Algerian Civil War, and also lived in France.
Alongside her research, Bourouiba takes part in mountain climbing and long bicycle rides.

References 

Living people
Year of birth missing (living people)
York University alumni
McGill University Faculty of Science alumni
MIT School of Engineering faculty
COVID-19 researchers
Fellows of the American Physical Society